Karsten Warholm (born 28 February 1996) is a Norwegian sprinter who competes in the 400 metres and 400 m hurdles. He is the 2020 Tokyo Olympic champion, a two-time world champion and the world record holder in the latter event.

Warholm has won gold for the 400 m hurdles at the World Athletics Championships in 2017 and 2019, as well as the 2018 and 2022 European Athletics Championships. He is a two-time Diamond League 400 m hurdles champion. In 2021, he was voted World Athletics Male Athlete of the Year.

In July 2021, Warholm broke the 29-year-old world record in 400 m hurdles. The following month at the 2020 Tokyo Olympics, he won the gold medal in the 400 m hurdles with a time of 45.94 seconds, breaking his own world record by over three-quarters of a second.

Career

Early career
In March 2013, Warholm won eight gold medals in the Norwegian Youth Indoors Championships. In June at the 2013 Bislett Games, he competed in the 200 metres, finishing seventh in his heat with a time of 22.25 s. Usain Bolt won a different heat at the same meet with a time of 19.79 s. At the 2013 World Youth Championships in July, he won gold in the boys' octathlon with 6451 points, a personal best.

In 2014, Warholm competed in the decathlon as well as in specialised events. At the time, his possible future specialization were the long jump, hurdling and 400 metres. His weakest performances in the decathlon were in the throwing events.

In June 2014, Warholm set a Norwegian junior record in the 400 m with a time of 46.31 s.

In July 2015, he won silver in the 400 m at the 2015 European Junior Championships with a time of 46.50 s, 0.02 s behind Benjamin Lobo Vedel. He also won silver in the decathlon with 7764 points, a personal best.

In July 2016, while participating in the semi-final of the 400 m hurdles at the 2016 European Championships, he broke the Norwegian national record with a time of 48.84 s. He then finished sixth in the final, with a time of 49.82 s. In August, he made it to the semi-finals in the 400 m hurdles at the 2016 Rio Olympics.

World championship title
In July 2017, Warholm won gold in the 400 m hurdles at the 2017 European U23 Championships, setting a championship record of 48.37 s. He also claimed silver in the 400 m with a time of 45.75 s. In August, he took gold in the 400 m hurdles at the 2017 World Championships with a time of 48.35 s. Two weeks after his success at the World Championships, he improved upon his own Norwegian record in the 400 m hurdles with a time of 48.22 s at the Weltklasse Zürich.

At the 2018 European Championships Warholm won the gold medal in the 400 m hurdles event with a time of 47.64 s, setting his new personal best and the new European U23 record.

In March, Warholm won gold in the 400 m at the 2019 European Athletics Indoor Championships. His time of 45.05 s equalled the European record set by Thomas Schönlebe in 1988. In June at the Bislett Games in Oslo, he broke the European men's 400 m hurdles record with a time of 47.33 s. At the Müller Anniversary Games in July, Warholm improved on his 400 m hurdles time, taking it to 47.12 s. At the Weltklasse Zürich in August, Warholm set a new European record in the event, with a time of 46.92 s, making him the third person to run under 47 seconds for the distance. He was chased to the finish line by Rai Benjamin, who became the fourth person to break 47 seconds, with a time of 46.98 s. At the 2019 World Athletics Championships in Doha, Qatar, he won the 400 m hurdles in a time of 47.42 seconds, retaining his championship title from 2017.

On 11 June, Warholm competed in the Impossible Games in Bislett Stadium in Oslo. He ran the 300 metres hurdles with a world best time of 33.78 s, besting Chris Rawlinson's time of 34.48 s set in 2002. He also ran 400 m indoors with a time of 45.97 s. On 23 August in Stockholm, Warholm ran a personal best of 46.87 s, narrowly missing Kevin Young's world record of 46.78 s. With this performance, Warholm became the first person to break 47 seconds twice.

World records and Olympic title
On 1 July 2021, in his first race of the season at Bislett Stadium in Oslo, Warholm broke Kevin Young's 1992 world record with a time of 46.70 s.

Warholm later broke his own record by 0.76 seconds at the postponed 2020 Tokyo Olympics, winning gold in a new world record of 45.94 s, an enormous 1.63% improvement on the previous record – the previous improvement of that magnitude was either David Hemery's 0.82 s improvement to 48.12 s in 1968 (1.68%, using fully automatic time), or Glenn Davis's 0.9 s improvement to 49.5 s in 1956 (1.79%, by official records including hand timing by the rules in place at the time). Warholm became the first European to win the event since Volker Beck in 1980. Warholm's time, the first sub-46 s time for the 400 m hurdles, was faster than 18 runners in the men's 400 m without hurdles.

The silver medalist in the final, Rai Benjamin, also beat the old record, with a time of 46.17 s; the bronze medalist, Alison dos Santos, was 0.02 seconds short of the old world record with a time of 46.72 s, but joined the other two in bettering the old Olympic record of 46.78 s. Warholm broke the old record without using the new "super spikes" worn by many of his competitors; He has criticized those spikes as "bullshit".

Career statistics

Information from World Athletics profile.

Personal bests

International championship results

Circuit wins and titles
 Diamond League champion 400 m hurdles (2):  2019,  2021. 
(400 m hurdles wins, other events specified in parenthesis)
 2017 (2): Oslo, Stockholm
 2018 (1): London
 2019 (5): Stockholm, Oslo, London, Paris, Zürich
 2020 [4]: Monaco, Stockholm (400 m & 400 m hurdles), Rome
 2021 (3): Oslo, Monaco, Zürich

Personal life
Warholm was born in the town of Ulsteinvik on Norway's western coast.

He is in a relationship with Oda Djupvik. He enjoys fishing, cars, and building Lego.

References

External links

 
 
 
 
 
 

1996 births
Living people
People from Ulstein
Norwegian decathletes
Norwegian male hurdlers
Athletes (track and field) at the 2016 Summer Olympics
Olympic athletes of Norway
World Athletics Championships athletes for Norway
European Athletics Rising Star of the Year winners
European Athletics Championships winners
World Athletics Championships winners
Diamond League winners
Norwegian Athletics Championships winners
Track & Field News Athlete of the Year winners
European Athlete of the Year winners
European Athletics Indoor Championships winners
Athletes (track and field) at the 2020 Summer Olympics
Medalists at the 2020 Summer Olympics
Olympic gold medalists in athletics (track and field)
Olympic gold medalists for Norway
Sportspeople from Møre og Romsdal
World Athletics record holders